Gerald Ian d'Acres Backhouse (6 December 1912 – 28 December 1941) was an Australian athlete who competed in the 1936 Summer Olympics.

In 1936 he finished eighth in the Olympic 800-metre event. In the 1500 metre competition he was eliminated in the first round.

At the 1938 Empire Games he won the silver medal in the 1 mile contest. In the 880 yards event he finished seventh.

During World War II Gerald Backhouse was a Sergeant in the Royal Australian Air Force, serving on attachment with the Royal Air Force. He died in a practice bombing flight in England on the 28 December 1941. He was buried at Sulloth (Causeway Head) Cemetery, Holme Low, Cumberland, England.

References

External links
 
 Gerald Backhouse at Australian Athletics Historical Results
 Gerald Backhouse at Virtual War Memorial Australia

1912 births
1941 deaths
Australian male middle-distance runners
Olympic athletes of Australia
Athletes (track and field) at the 1936 Summer Olympics
Athletes (track and field) at the 1938 British Empire Games
Commonwealth Games silver medallists for Australia
Commonwealth Games medallists in athletics
Royal Australian Air Force personnel of World War II
Royal Australian Air Force airmen
Australian military personnel killed in World War II
20th-century Australian people
Medallists at the 1938 British Empire Games